Helena Vašáková (born April 27, 1961) is a Czechoslovak sprint canoer who competed in the early 1980s. She was eliminated in the semifinals of the K-2 500 m event at the 1980 Summer Olympics in Moscow.

References

1961 births
Canoeists at the 1980 Summer Olympics
Czechoslovak female canoeists
Living people
Olympic canoeists of Czechoslovakia